General Peck may refer to:

DeWitt Peck (1894–1973), U.S. Marine Corps major general
Hamilton S. Peck (1845–1933), Vermont National Guard brigadier general
Henry Peck (British Army officer) (1874–1965), British Army major general
James Stevens Peck (1838–1884), Vermont National Guard brigadier general
John J. Peck (1821–1878), Union Army major general
Richard Peck (British Army officer) (born 1937), British Army major general
Theodore S. Peck (1843–1918), Vermont National Guard brevet major general
William R. Peck (1818–1871), Confederate States Army brigadier general